Isyana Sarasvati (born 2 May 1993) is an Indonesian singer-songwriter. She is a graduate of Singapore's Nanyang Academy of Fine Arts and London's Royal College of Music. Known for her original compositions, she wrote all of the songs on her 2015 debut pop album, Explore! and on her two subsequent albums, Paradox (2017) and Lexicon (2019). She has also performed as an opera singer in Singapore. She is the recipient of numerous Indonesian and international awards.

Early life and education
Isyana was born in Bandung on 2 May 1993. She spent part of her early childhood outside Indonesia because her parents worked and studied in Belgium. When she was seven, her family moved to Bandung, West Java. Isyana is the youngest daughter of Luana Marpanda, a music teacher, and Sapta Dwikardana, a lecturer and graphologist. She has an older sister, a cultural anthropologist, who also sang in a called Banda Neira. Raised in a family of educators, Isyana was introduced to music at the age of four by her mother. Isyana plays piano, electone, flute, violin and saxophone.

Isyana's music career in Indonesia began with several covers of popular songs of 2012 and 2013, uploaded on her YouTube and SoundCloud channels. After turning down initial offers of recording contracts because she wanted to focus on her studies, she signed with Sony Music Indonesia in 2014.

At age 16, Isyana received a scholarship from the Singapore Government to study Music Performance at the Nanyang Academy of Fine Arts (NAFA). in 2012, she was an exchange student at Tainan National University of the Arts, Tainan, Taiwan. In 2013, she obtained a Diploma in Music Performance. Isyana was awarded a full scholarship to study further at NAFA in collaboration with the Royal College of Music (RCM) in London, under the Bachelor of Music with Honours Funded Degree Program. In her final year of study, she received the RCM Excellence Award Scholarship (2015). On 26 September 2015, Isyana graduated from NAFA with a Bachelor of Music and received the Best Graduate and Embassy of Peru awards.

Music career 
Before gaining fame as a pop singer and songwriter, she had built a reputation as a classical music soloist and recitalist. Isyana also participated in numerous musical competitions. At age 15, she won a "best composer" award. Her song Wings of Your Shadow was selected as the 12th best composition of 3,500 entries in the International Junior Original Concert (IJOC). As a result, she performed the electone at the IJOC 2008 concert in Bunkamura hall, Tokyo, Japan. Isyana signed a recording deal with Sony Music Indonesia in 2014 and released two singles, Keep Being You (2014) and Tetap Dalam Jiwa (2015). Her albums have received positive reviews and commercial success.

On 2 September 2018, Isyana sang the first song at the closing ceremony of the 18th Asian Games in Jakarta, Indonesia, performing Asia's Who We Are before an audience of more than 55,000 people at Gelora Bung Karno Stadium.

They were interviewed in Tokyo by Alan Menken, the man behind many Walt Disney Animation Studios film scores.
Isyana was also a panelist for Season 4 of The Voice Kids Indonesia.

In 2019, she was listed on Forbes Indonesia's 30 Under 30 list of inspiring young achievers, in the art, style and entertainment category. In April 2020, Forbes Asia included Isyana on its 30 Under 30 list in the Entertainment and Sports, and Celebrity categories.

After six years with Sony Music Indonesia, Isyana on 20 October 2020 announced she had established a music label called REDROSE RECORDS. On 2 February 2021, Isyana and her husband Rayhan released a single titled 1+1 to mark their first wedding anniversary.

On March 10, 2022, Garena Free Fire Indonesia announced an collaboration with Isyana with the concept of The Diva on Battle In Style, the collaboration resulted in a music video with a Free Fire theme song arranged by Isyana. FF Esport ID even collaborated with Isyana's song "IL SOGNO" and a lyric video with the theme of FFIM which was released on the YouTube FF Esport ID channel and became a backsound at the Free Fire Indonesia Masters 2022 Spring competition.

On 2 October 2022, Isyana released her first NFT with the title My Mystery NFT.

As soloist and recitalist
 Jakarta Concert Orchestra, Gedung Teater Jakarta (2018)
 Vienna at the Turn of 19th Century Concert, Aula Simfonia Jakarta (2017)
 Toyota Classics Concert, Jakarta (2016)
 Gloria Nafa Orchestra & Chorus Gala Concert, Victoria Concert Hall – Singapore (2016)
 Soloist in Vocal Recital "The Rising Star Concert Series", The Resonanz Music Studio, Jakarta (2015)
 Classical Goes To Cinema, Jakarta (2014) 
 Juvenum New Year Concert, Jakarta (2014) 
 Wonderful Christmas Concert, Aula Simfonia Jakarta – Indosiar (2013)
 Soloist in Dinner en Blanc Event, Singapore (2013)
 Soprano Solo LOVE, NAFA Consert Series (2013)
 Soloist Vocal The High Scorers Concert Diploma Nanyang Academy of Fine Arts (NAFA)
 Soloist Guest as the 1st Winner Competition in Final 7th Tan Ngiang Kaw/Tan Ngiang Ann Vocal Competition, Singapore (2013)
 Soloist, in Remembering Zubir Said's legacy (Singapore)
 Soloist Soprano (R. Strauss, Four Last Songs) with NAFA Orchestra, NAFA Concert Series (2012)
 Soloist in Concert The Resonanz Music Studio, Jakarta (2012)
 National High Achievers’ ABRSM Concert 2007, Indonesia (2007)
 National High Achievers’ ABRSM, Indonesia (2004).

Operatic performances
 Opera "La Princesse Jaune" in Singapore, as Lena (2014)
 Grand Premiere of "Clara" with Ananda Sukarlan & Orchestra in Indonesia, as Clara (2014)
 Opera Comique "At The Airport" with New Opera Singapore, as Air Stewardess (2013)
 Singing Duet, Love Philosophy NAFA Concert Series, Singapore (2013)
 Soloist in Opera Comique 2, In The Class Room with New Opera Singapore (2012)
 NAFA Opera Scene, Singapore, as Rosina & Papagena (2012)
 NAFA Opera Scene Commedia Lirica, Singapore, as Nanneta (2011)

Personal life
Isyana is Sundanese and Javanese. She met Rayhan Maditra Indrayanto in junior high school. They began dating in 2007. After being in a relationship for 12 years, they became engaged on 29 December 2019 and were married on 2 February 2020 in Bandung.

Discography

Studio albums

Extended plays

Singles

Filmography

Talkshow Program 
Isyana created a program called "METAL" which stands for MAKAN SANTEI TAPI ENDOL, the event also became her debut as a host. The format of the show is packaged in a relaxed manner with the main content of having fun chatting and casual dining with guest stars who are presented differently in each episode. The show premiered on April 9, 2021 featuring Rossa.

Film

Television

Web series

Awards

Vocal (Soprano)
International & National

 2014 Awarded the "RCM Excellence Award (Degree)" Scholarship
 2013 1st Winner (Grand Prize) Tembang Puitik Ananda Sukarlan National Vocal Competition (Surabaya, Indonesia)
 2013 Awarded the "NAFA Entry Scholarship (Degree)" (Full Scholarship)
 2013 Gold Certificate, 5th Bangkok Opera Foundation Singing Competition (Bangkok, Thailand)
 2012 First Prize, 6th Tan Ngiang Kaw/Tan Ngiang Ann Memorial Vocal Competition (Singapore)
 2010 Tuition Grant from Singapore MOE for Diploma Study at NAFA

Electone
International

 2012 Semi-finalist Yamaha Electone Electone Concours 2011 – Open Age Section (Tokyo, Japan) Yamaha Music Scholarship in Asia (Singapore)
 2011 Grand Prize, Asia Pacific Electone Festival 2011 – Open Age Section (Singapore)
 2009 Yamaha Music Scholarship in Asia 2009 (Indonesia)
 2008 International Junior Original Concert (IJOC) – Top 12 best compositions (Tokyo, Japan)
 2008 Third Prize, Asia Electone Festival (AEF) 2008 – Junior Section (Indonesia)
 2005 Grand Prize, Asia Electone Festival (AEF) 2005 – Junior Section (Indonesia)

National

 2011 Grand Prix Award, Yamaha Electone Festival 2011 – Open Age Section (Singapore)
 2009 Second Prize, National Yamaha Electone Festival 2009 (Jakarta, Indonesia) Grand Prix Award, Yamaha Electone Festival 2009 – Open Section (Bandung, Indonesia)
 2008 Grand Prize, National Yamaha Electone Festival 2008, Junior Section (Surabaya, Indonesia)
 2005 Second Prize, National Yamaha Electone Festival 2005 – Junior Section (Jakarta, Indonesia)

Piano
National & Regional

 2010 Finalist, Yamaha Piano Competition Indonesia (Jakarta, Indonesia)
 2010 First prize, Yamaha Piano Competition West Java Regional (Bandung, Indonesia)
 2009 First Prize, Piano Competition Pianist Bandung (Bandung, Indonesia)
 2008 Participant, UPH Chopin Piano Competition (Jakarta, Indonesia)
 2007 Finalist, Yamaha Piano Competition Indonesia (Jakarta, Indonesia) First prize, Piano Competition West Java Regional (Indonesia)

Honors and awards

Isyana is the recipient of awards from Anugerah Musik Indonesia, Billboard Indonesia, Cornetto Pop Awards, Dahsyatnya Awards, Hai Reader's Poll Music Awards, Inbox Awards, Indonesian Box Office Movie Awards (IBOMA), Indonesian Choice Awards, Insert Awards, Maya Awards, Rolling Stone Editor's Choice Awards, SCTV Music Awards, and Showbiz Indonesia Awards.

Isyana was named Best Asian Artist Indonesia 2016 and Best Composer of the Year 2017 at the MAMA (Mnet Asian Music Awards) and 2 Anugerah Planet Muzik. In late 2017 Isyana was nominated for Best Southeast Asia Act at the MTV EMA, London. For her contribution and support to Indonesian music, she was given the 2016 Anugerah Kekayaan Intelektual Nasional award (certificate of appreciation for Copyright and Related Rights) from the Ministry of Law and Human Rights.

Concerts

International Music Festival

Java Jazz Festival, JIExpo Kemayoran (2015)
Java Jazz Festival, JIExpo Kemayoran (2016) 
, Prambanan temple – Yogyakarta (2017)
We the Fest, JIExpo Kemayoran (2018)
Java Jazz Festival, JIExpo Kemayoran (2019)
Java Jazz Festival, JIExpo Kemayoran (2020)
, (Virtual Festival Edition) Prambanan temple – Yogyakarta (2020)
Round Festival (ASEAN & KOREA ON-TACT MUSIC FESTIVAL), A Music Network Connecting ASEAN & KOREA (2020)
We the Fest, GBK Sports Complex, Senayan (2022)

Leadership experiences
 2009–2010 President Student Organisation Taruna Bakti Senior High School (Bandung, Indonesia)
 2007 Chairperson of English Division, Taruna Bakti Problem Solving Contest (Bandung,  Indonesia)
 2006–2007 Vice President Student Organisation Taruna Bakti Secondary School (Bandung, Indonesia)
 2006 Participant 1st International Convention for Youth Leaders, Singapore (RGS-ICYL 2006)

References

External links 
Isyana Sarasvati discography on iTunes

1993 births
Living people
English-language singers from Indonesia
Indonesian composers
21st-century Indonesian women singers
Indonesian jazz singers
Indonesian pop singers
Indonesian rhythm and blues singers
Indonesian songwriters
Indonesian sopranos
Indonesian soul singers
Javanese people
Sundanese people
People from Bandung
Anugerah Musik Indonesia winners
MAMA Award winners
Indonesian Muslims
Women in electronic music